Colin Johnson may refer to:

 Colin Johnson (bishop) (born 1952), Anglican Archbishop of Toronto
 Colin Johnson (cricketer) (born 1947), English cricketer
 Collin Johnson (born 1997), American football player
 Mudrooroo (Colin Thomas Johnson, 1938–2019), Australian novelist, poet, essayist and playwright